Katie Gately is an American musician, composer, producer and sound designer based in Los Angeles, California. As well as her own releases she has remixed Björk and Zola Jesus and produced for serpentwithfeet. Her most recent album, Loom, was released on the 14th February 2020.

Background 
Gately was raised in Brooklyn, New York and moved to Los Angeles to study at USC where she graduated with an MFA in Film Production, where she focused on Sound Design. Gately also holds a BA in Philosophy from Carleton College, and had focused on Philosophy of Music.

After releasing singles on Blue Tapes, Fet Press, FatCat, and a mini album on Public Information, Gately released her debut album Color in 2016.

Color 

Her debut album Color was released in 2016 with Tri-Angle, and it meshed samples and found sounds with manipulations of her own voice to create maximalist electronic compositions deploying fractured rhythms, fierce licks and bold samples. Will Neibergall writes in a Tiny Mix Tapes review, "While it has predictably little in common with anything else she’s done, Color shares the cinematic quality of the latter. Where her self-titled EP could soundtrack body horror or seismic intensity, Gately’s debut Tri Angle LP is darkly whimsical." Clare Lobenfeld writes for Pitchfork, "Gately benefits from sound design know-how from her film production MFA studies at USC and her professional experience. This skill set benefits the intricacies of her beat constructions—harmonies built on tweaked vocal samples to bolster her own voice ("Sift"); cello and garbage-can percussion eloquently melding to make something reminiscent of grunge, but still reflective of current electronic trends at its core ("Frisk")."

Loom 
She returned to her family home in Brooklyn and started again, rebuilding the album around the track ‘Bracer’, which was her mother’s favorite.

Loom was critically acclaimed upon its release with publications such as The Guardian, Pitchfork, Paste, The Quietus, Loud and Quiet, musicOMH, Brooklyn Vegan and The Financial Times including the album in their Best Albums of 2020.

Pipes 

Pipes was composed, recorded, produced and engineered by Gately, and Quietus named Pipes as one of their albums of the year in 2014.

Influences 

Katie Gately mentions Kid A, Tarkovsky’s Stalker and The Mirror as a few of her early influences in music. She recalls and states "becoming obsessed with mostly British post-punk and then at the same time I was interested in Autechre and weird electronic music... It made me feel like, 'I don't know what I'm feeling, I don't know what this is, and I feel like something new.' It's very bizarre and uncomfortable and exciting, and I started to become addicted to that feeling; definitely feeling excited in a positive way, but with this ambiguity, and this feeling of unpredictability. In a 2016 interview with The Guardian, she said, "I’m a pretty diehard Billy Joel fan, which my parents raised me to believe was normal but friends have since told me is unfortunate."

Discography

Albums

Singles

Remixes

Productions

Compositions 
 2014: Passer Passer - Sound Designer
 2016: Once Upon a Line - Sound Designer

Collaborations, other 
 2010: Mimeomeme, Seattle Phonographers Union, CD, October 2010

References

External links 
 

Year of birth missing (living people)
Living people
American women musicians
American women composers
American sound artists
People from New York City
21st-century American women